John Dean "Jeff" Cooper (May 10, 1920 – September 25, 2006) was a United States Marine, the creator of a "modern technique" of handgun shooting, and an expert on the use and history of small arms.

Early life and education 
Cooper was born in Los Angeles where he enrolled in the Junior Reserve Officers' Training Corps at Los Angeles High School. He graduated from Stanford University with a bachelor's degree in political science. He received a regular commission in the United States Marine Corps (USMC) in September 1941. During World War II he served in the Pacific theatre with the Marine Detachment aboard . By the end of the war he had been promoted to major. He resigned his commission in 1949, but returned to active duty during the Korean War, where he claimed to be involved in irregular warfare in Southeast Asia, and was promoted to lieutenant colonel. After the Korean War, the Marine Corps declined his application to remain on active duty. In the mid-1960s, he received a master's degree in history from the University of California, Riverside. From the late 1950s through the early 1970s, he was a part-time high school and community college history teacher.

Career
In 1976, Cooper founded the American Pistol Institute (API) in Paulden, Arizona (later the Gunsite Academy). Cooper began teaching shotgun and rifle classes to both law enforcement and military personnel, as well as civilians, and conducted on-site training for individuals and groups from around the world. He sold the firm in 1992 but continued living on the Paulden ranch. He was known for his advocacy of large-caliber handguns, especially the Colt 1911 and the .45 ACP cartridge.

Cooper, along with Michael Dixon and Thomas Dornaus, worked on the design of the Bren Ten pistol around the 10mm Auto, based on the Czech CZ 75 design. The cartridge was more powerful than both the 9×19mm Parabellum and the .45 ACP round.

The Modern Technique of the Pistol 
Cooper's modern technique defines pragmatic use of the pistol for personal protection. The modern technique emphasizes two-handed shooting using the Weaver stance, competing with and eventually supplanting the once-prevalent one-handed shooting style. The five elements of the modern technique are:
A large caliber pistol, preferably a semi-automatic 
The Weaver stance
The draw stroke
The flash sight picture
The compressed surprise trigger break

Firearm conditions of readiness 

There are several conditions of readiness in which such a weapon can be carried. Cooper promulgated most of the following terms:

Condition 4: Chamber empty, no magazine in the gun, hammer down, safety on.
Condition 3: Chamber empty, full magazine in place, hammer down, safety on.
Condition 2: A round chambered, full magazine in place, hammer down, safety on.
Condition 1: A round chambered, full magazine in place, hammer cocked, safety on. Also referred to as "cocked and locked."
Condition 0: A round chambered, full magazine in place, hammer cocked, safety off.

Condition 0 is considered "ready to fire"; as a result, there is a risk of accidental or negligent discharge carrying in Condition 0.

Combat mindset and the Cooper color code 
The most important means of surviving a lethal confrontation, according to Cooper, is neither the weapon nor the martial skills. The primary tool is the combat mindset, set forth in his book, Principles of Personal Defense.

Cooper came up with a color code, consisting of four colors: white, yellow, orange, and red.

The color code, as originally introduced by Cooper, had nothing to do with tactical situations or alertness levels, but rather with one's state of mind. Cooper did not claim to have invented anything in particular with the color code, but he was apparently the first to use it as an indication of mental state.

The USMC uses "Condition Black," although it was not originally part of Cooper's color code. According to Massad Ayoob, "Condition Black," in Cooper's youth, meant "combat in progress." "Condition Black" is also used to mean "immobilized by panic" or "overwhelmed by fear".

Rifle concepts
Cooper is best known for his work in pistol training, but he favored the rifle for tactical shooting. He often described the handgun as a convenient-to-carry stopgap weapon, allowing someone the opportunity to get to a rifle.

Scout rifle
Greatly influenced by the life and writings of Frederick Russell Burnham, Cooper published an article in the 1980s describing his ideal of a general-purpose rifle: "a short, light, handy, versatile, utility rifle", which he dubbed a scout rifle. This was a bolt-action carbine chambered in .308 Winchester, less than 1 meter in length, less than 3 kilograms in weight, with iron sights, a forward-mounted optical sight (long eye relief scope), and fitted with a practical sling. Cooper defined his goal: a general-purpose rifle is a conveniently portable, individually operated firearm, capable of striking a single decisive blow on a live target of up to 200 kilos in weight at any distance at which the operator can shoot with the precision necessary to place a shot in a vital area of the target. Cooper felt the scout rifle should be suited to a man operating like the scout Burnham, either alone or in a two- or three-man team.

In late 1997, with Cooper's oversight, Steyr Mannlicher produced a rifle to his "scout" specifications. Cooper considered the Steyr Scout "perfect." Riflemen regard Cooper's development of the scout rifle concept and his subsequent work on the evolution of the Steyr-Mannlicher Scout rifle as his most significant and enduring contributions to riflecraft. Ruger (Gunsite Scout Rifle), Savage Arms, Springfield Armory, and Mossberg have made versions of the scout rifle as well.

Ammunition concepts

Cooper was dissatisfied with the small-diameter 5.56×45mm NATO (.223 Remington) of the AR-15 and envisioned a need for a large-bore (.44 caliber or greater) cartridge in a semi-automatic rifle to provide increased stopping power and one-shot kills on big-game animals at 250 yards. The so-called Thumper concept inspired the development of the .450 Bushmaster, .458 SOCOM, .458 HAM'R, .499 LWR, and the .50 Beowulf, among other cartridges, all suitable for integration into the AR-15/M16 rifle/M4 carbine or AR-10/M14 rifle platforms.

Along the lines of the Thumper concept, Tim LeGendre of LeMag Firearms developed .45 Professional, the predecessor of the .450 Bushmaster cartridge, and later built and delivered an AR-15 in .45 Professional to Cooper, while Bill Alexander of Alexander Arms developed the .50 Beowulf.

Encountering similar lack of stopping power issues as Cooper, the need for a large bore round for the AR-15 platform came about from informal discussion of members of the special operations command, specifically Task Force Ranger's experience in the Battle of Mogadishu (1993) that multiple shots were required to incapacitate members of the opposing force. Many Somalis would chew the drug Khat all day and the effects of the drug would both curb their appetite and increase their pain tolerance. Consequently Marty ter Weeme of Teppo Jutsu designed the .458 SOCOM cartridge in 2000 and Tony Rumore of Tromix was contracted to build the first .458 SOCOM rifle in February 2001. Later even more Thumper rounds have been developed for the AR-15 platform in the US and in other countries such as the .458 Alpine, .458 Silent death and .460 Alliance.

Among the Thumper rounds requiring the use of the AR-10 platform due to their larger cartridge dimensions are the .45 Raptor, .50 Thumper, .50 Razorback, .50 Krater, .500 Kratos/Enforcer, .500 Auto Max, .500 Phantom, .500 Whisper, .510 Whisper, .510 Snipe-Tac and the .510 Winchester Short Magnum cartridges. This wide spectrum of calibers developed until today along the line of the Thumper concept ranging from Wildcat cartridges to commercially available rifle/cartridge combinations and to calibers with approval through SAAMI or C.I.P. suggests that this field has not yet produced optimized solutions and is still subject to engineering optimization.

A modern Thumper round specifically developed for hunting large Scandinavian game is the .510 Førland which is mostly used in converted Sako TRG rifles, while Blaser in Germany developed the .45 Blaser for their R93 straight-pull action rifle. The .50 Alaskan developed by Harold Johnson and Harold Fuller of the Kenai Peninsula of Alaska in the 1950s based on the .348 Winchester as well as the .45 Alaskan, .457 Wild West Magnum, and the .510 Kodiak Express are in some sense predecessors of Jeff Cooper's Thumper concept originating from the time of hunting large bears in Alaska using lever action rifles.

The Russian 12.7×55mm STs-130 cartridge is a military Thumper round designed in 2002. It is used in the VKS bullpup sniper rifle, the ShAK-12 bullpup battle rifle and in the RSh-12 revolver. Like the .510 Whisper round it was developed from the case of the .416 Rigby/.338 Lapua Magnum cartridge.

Writing
In 1997, Cooper wrote that he coined the term hoplophobia in 1962 "in response to a perceived need for a word to describe a mental aberration consisting of an unreasoning terror of gadgetry, specifically, weapons."

In addition to his books on firearms and self-defense, Cooper wrote several books recounting his life adventures plus essays and short stories, including Fire Works (1980); Another Country: Personal Adventures of the Twentieth Century (1992); To Ride, Shoot Straight and Speak the Truth (1988); and C Stories (2004).  His daughter Lindy Wisdom published a biography, Jeff Cooper: the Soul and the Spirit (1996).

Some of the comments from his "Gunsite Gossip" newsletter were printed in Guns & Ammo magazine as "Cooper's Corner" and later were compiled into The Gargantuan Gunsite Gossip. These were his thoughts on firearms interleaved with his wide-ranging musings on many other subjects, and acquired a large U.S. and international following from the 1980s up to his death. Cooper wrote extensively in defense of firearms rights.

A complete bibliography of Jeff Cooper's writings from 1947 onwards is available at the Jeff Cooper Bibliography Project.

Personal life
Cooper was married to his wife Janelle for 64 years. They had three daughters. He died at his home on September 25, 2006, at the age of 86. He is buried on his ranch at Gunsite in Paulden, Arizona.Jeff Cooper Foundation</ref>

Political views
In 1991, Cooper wrote in Guns & Ammo magazine that "no more than five to ten people in a hundred who die by gunfire in Los Angeles are any loss to society. These people fight small wars amongst themselves. It would seem a valid social service to keep them well-supplied with ammunition." In 1994, Cooper said "Los Angeles and Ho Chi Minh City have declared themselves sister cities. It makes sense: they are both Third World metropolises formerly occupied by Americans."

See also

Handgun hunting
Jack Weaver
Mel Tappan
Self-defense
Thell Reed

References
Abbreviations:
 CC: Cooper's Commentaries
 GG: Gunsight Gossip
 GGG1: The Gargantuan Gunsight Gossip, Gunsight Press, Paulden, Arizona, USA, 1990, contains Gunsight Gossip Volumes 1 to 9, 1981 to 1989.
 GGG2: Gargantuan Gunsight Gossip 2, Gunsight Press, Paulden, Arizona, USA, 2001, contains Gunsight Gossip Volumes 10 to 20, 1990 to 2000.
 GGG3: Gargantuan Gunsight Gossip 3, Gunsight Press, Paulden, Arizona, USA, 2010, contains Gunsight Gossip Volumes 21 to 26, 2001 to 2006.

Cooper's Commentaries is an unedited superset of Gunsight Gossip, with CC Vol. 1, No. 1 corresponding to GG Vol. XIII, No. 9, and an edited version of these were published as "Cooper's Corner" in Guns & Ammo magazine starting in 1986.

Further reading

External links

Official Website of The Jeff Cooper Legacy Foundation
Origins of Have a Gun at The Gun Zone
Jeff Cooper's Commentaries
Jeff Cooper Books official site of Jeff Cooper and Wisdom Publishing (per Lindy Cooper Wisdom)

1920 births
2006 deaths
American columnists
American gun rights activists
United States Marine Corps personnel of World War II
United States Marine Corps personnel of the Korean War
Firearm training
Gun writers
IPSC shooters
People associated with firearms
Stanford University alumni
Survivalists
United States Marine Corps officers
20th-century American non-fiction writers